Malwa College of Nursing was established in Nov 2000 by Dr. Ravinder Singh. It is named after Malwa, a region of Punjab  and headquartered in Kotkapura in the district of Faridkot in the state of  Punjab .

Malwa College of Nursing is recognized by Indian Nursing Council  (I.N.C.) New Delhi, Punjab Nurses Registration Council Chandigarh , Punjab Govt. and affiliated to Baba Farid University of Health Sciences Faridkot.

The Malwa College of Nursing, Kotkapura is managed by The Malwa Educational Society (Regd.) Faridkot which was registered on 12 January 1999 under the Society Registration Act(XXI of 1860).

The Malwa College of Nursing is constructed on its own land near the Railway Crossing at Faridkot Road, Kotkapura (Faridkot district) Punjab (India).  The College is situated at Bombay-Bathinda-Firozpur National Highway (Indian RailwaysTrack). Kotkapura is a Railway Junction on Firozpur-Bathinda-Delhi-Bombay line from where one Railway line also goes to Muktsar-Fazilka. It is also approachable by the Ludhiana-Moga-Kotkapura-Muktsar-Abohar National Highway and from Amritsar via National Highway-15. Malwa College is an ISO9001-2000 certified College.

Campus
Malwa College campus is spread over 4 acres area and has natural surroundings. Inside the campus separate wings for college, hostel and teaching block occupies as per INC norms. It also constructed three floors which are established away from the pollution and disturbance.

History
Malwa College of Nursing® was established in the year 2000 by founder Dr. Ravinder Singh as Malwa Institute of Nursing with 40 seats of G.N.M course. Then seats were increased to 60. In 2007 institute has gained n.o.c certificate to start  B.Sc(Nursing).

Courses

G.N.M.
 Three years diploma course for 10+2 graduate students

B.Sc.Nursing(Post Basic)
 Two years degree course after completion of G.N.M course

B.Sc.Nursing(Basic)
 Four years degree course for 10+2(medical) graduate students

M.Sc.Nursing
 Two years Masters after completion of B.Sc.Nursing(Basic or Post-Basic)

External links
   Facebook   Twitter  Instagram

Universities and colleges in Punjab, India
Faridkot, Punjab
Nursing schools in India